Wheelchair fencing at the 2000 Summer Paralympics consisted of épée, foil, and sabre events.

Medal table

Participating nations

Medallists

References 

 

2000 Summer Paralympics events
2000
Paralympics
International fencing competitions hosted by Australia